The 1999 Nippon Professional Baseball season was the 50th season of operation for the league.

Regular season standings

Central League

Pacific League

Japan Series

See also
1999 Major League Baseball season

References

 
1999 in baseball
1999 in Japanese sport